Trischaken is an historical Austrian and German gambling card game for three to five players and related to French Brelan.

History 
Trischaken is mentioned as a card game as early as 1706 in a poem  and listed as a banned gambling game in a 1734 law book of Anhalt-Bernburg. An indication of its distribution is given by its inclusion in a 1771 Bremen-Lower Saxon dictionary and its description as "popular" in Bavaria from at least the late 18th  to mid-19th century. The word was also spelt dreschaken, meaning "to beat, thrash, cudgel", and may have been derived from dreschen, to thresh, recalling the game of Karnöffel whose name also means "to thrash". In 1871 it was described as a game of chance, popular with peasants "in the provinces" and played with the "large old German cards", which presumably meant 36- or even 48-card, German-suited packs.

Treschaken was equated with French Brelan and the game of Krimp, Krimpen or Krimpenspiel.

Description 
The Brothers Grimm give a brief description of Drischaken as a game for three to five players in which each receives 3 cards and the winner is the one who has the most cards of various possible combinations. They give various alternative spellings as drischäken, drischeken, dreschakn, trischaken and trischakeln. and adds that, "likewise karnöfeln means playing as well as thrashing", referring to another widespread card game of the time.

According to Popowitsch (1705–1774), the Austrian game of Trischack (Trischackspiel) was played with 3 cards and the Jack (Bub) or Nine – known as Pamfili – of each suit are wild. In Saxony and Silesia, they were called Wenzels or Scharwenzels. Thus it may have been related to the Bavarian game of Scherwenzel. In Austrian, the Schärwenzel (i.e. the 7, 8 and 9 or the 7, 8 and Jack) was the highest card. In Franconia and Saxony, Trischaken was played with 4 cards per player using German-suited cards.

A detailed description in German of the rules of Brelan (aka Trischaken) is given in Pierer's Universal Lexikon, Volume 3 in 1868.

Other uses 
Schmidt suggests an actual link with Karnöffel as well as a game called Treschack, played with 3 Kings (It.: tre sciacchi), neither of which resemble Brelan.

In modern times, Trischaken has become a null contract in the popular European Tarot card game of Königrufen.

References

Literature 
 _ (1855). Sitzungsberichte by the Vienna Academy of Sciences (Akademie der Wissenschaften in Wien Philosophisch-Historische Klasse). Vienna: Imperial and Royal Printers.
 Beermann, Siegmund (1706). Einige historische Nachrichten und Anmerckungen von der Graffschafft Pyrmont. Frankfurt and Leipzig: Hauenstein.
 Cella, Johann Jakob (1786). Johann Jakob Cella's, J. V. D. und Hochfürstl. Anspach. Justizrath und Kastner zu Ferrieden freymüthige Aufsätze. Vol. 3. Anspach [Ansbach]: Benedict Friedrich Haueisen.
 Frisch, Johann Leonhard (1755). Nouveau Dictionnaire des Passagers François-Allemand et Allemand-François. Leipzig: Johann Friedrich Gleditsch. 
 Grimm Jacob and Wilhelm Grimm (1860). Deutsches Wörterbuch, 6th edn., vol. 2.
 Kaiser, Friedrich (1871). Ein Pfaffenleben (Abraham a Sancta Clara): historischer Volksroman. Vol. 1. Vienna: Waldheim.
 Pierer, H.A. (1868). Universal-Lexikon der Gegenwart und Vergangenheit oder neuestes encyclopädisches Wörterbuch der Wissenschaften, Künste und Gewerbe, 3rd volume, 5th fully improved edn. Altenberg (Bodmerci-Chimpanzee). Altenburg: Pierer.
 Schmidt, Karl Christian Ludwig Schmidt (1800). Westerwäldisches Idiotikon, oder Sammlung der auf dem Westerwalde. Hadermar and Herborn: Gelehrte Buchhandlung.
 Popowitsch, Johann Siegmund Valentin (18C) [2004]. Vocabula Austriaca et Stiriaca. Part 2. P. Lang.
 Weber, Karl Julius (1855). Deutschland, oder Briefe eines in Deutschland reisenden Deutscher, Vols. 1-2. p. 332.

Austrian card games
German card games
Gambling games
Historical card games